The Five Blind Boys of Mississippi was an American post-war gospel quartet. They started with lead singer Archie Brownlee, their single "Our Father" reached number ten on the Billboard R&B charts in early 1951. Then the screams of their new lead singer Big Henry Johnson captivated audiences all over the world. Jimmy was the heart of the group and the longest standing member.   It was one of the first gospel records to do so.

John Fogerty's goal for the line, "Rollin', rollin', rollin' on the river," in the song "Proud Mary" was to evoke male gospel harmonies, as exemplified by groups such as the Swan Silvertones, the Sensational Nightingales, and the Five Blind Boys of Mississippi.

History
The group originated in 1936 as a quartet of students from the Piney Woods School near Jackson, Mississippi.  The students — Brownlee, Joseph Ford, Lawrence Abrams, and Lloyd Woodard — originally sang under the name "the Cotton Blossom Singers", performing jubilee quartet and secular material, to raise money for the school. Their teacher, Martha Louise Morrow Foxx, helped organize the blind singers at the behest of the school founder Laurence C. Jones. On March 9, 1937, Brownlee and the others recorded sacred tunes (as the Blind Boys) and three secular numbers (as Abraham, Woodard, and Patterson) for Library of Congress researcher Alan Lomax. After graduation in the early forties, they began performing professionally singing pop music as the Cotton Blossom Singers and religious material under the name The Jackson Harmoneers. They were often backed by a female jazz band which originated from the same country school known as "The International Sweethearts of Rhythm." In the early 1940s, Melvin Henderson, also known as Melvin Hendrix, joined the group making them—like many so-called quartets—actually a quintet.

In the mid-1940s, Brownlee and the others relocated to Chicago, and changed their name to the Five Blind Boys of Mississippi.  Under the influence of R.H. Harris of the Soul Stirrers, Brownlee moved away from the jubilee style of singing and towards a more popular hard gospel style. Even though Harris' influence was persuasive—the Blind Boys at first covered Soul Stirrers songs almost exclusively—Brownlee's high voice, which could move from a sweet croon to a devastating scream, was one of the most recognizable in gospel. Though blind from birth, he would also sometimes leap from a stage into the audience below .

With the addition of hard gospel shouter Rev. Percell Perkins (1917-2003) (who replaced Henderson), the Blind Boys moved into their period of greatest fame. Perkins, who was not blind, became the group's manager, and they began to record, first for Excelsior in 1946, then for Coleman in 1948. Ford was replaced by another blind bass singer who later regained his sight and had to leave the group. He was replaced by J.T. Clinkscales, in that year, and in 1950 the group moved to  Peacock Records where they recorded the hit "Our Father"  at their first session.

And over the course of 10 years the Blind Boys recorded such hits as "Old Ship Of Zion", "Coming Home", "Will Jesus Be Waiting?", "Song Of Praise", "I Wonder, Do You?", "In The Wilderness", "I Never Heard A Man", "Let's Have Church", "Leave You In The Hands Of The Lord", and "Someone Watches".  Brownlee died of pneumonia while touring in New Orleans on February 8, 1960, at the age of 34, and not long after Perkins left as well to go into the ministry.

Brownlee was, at first,  replaced by Roscoe Robinson and, after Robinson left the group to go out on his own, by the very able lead Henry Johnson, who, like Brownlee, made devastating screams. Quartet veteran Willmer Broadnax took the position of second lead. He was later replaced by Willie Mincey.  Broadnax, in particular, had a high voice which was comparable, in some respects, to Brownlee's.  Other singers who worked with the group for a time included Rev. Sammy Lewis, Rev. George Warren, James Watts, and Vance Powell.  By the end of the 1960s, the group had released 27 singles and 2 albums for Peacock. In the 1970s and early 1980s, they recorded some material for Jewel, and they continued to tour into the 1990s. Of the three remaining members of the original group, Lloyd Woodard died in June 1973, Lawrence Abrams passed on in August, 1982, and Henry Johnson passed on December 10, 1999.

The Five Blind Boys of Mississippi should not be confused with The Blind Boys of Alabama, a group led by Clarence Fountain. There is some dispute as to which of the two groups was named first. Some sources say that the Five Blind Boys took their name when Percell Perkins joined them in the mid-1940s. According to Fountain, however, the two groups were actually christened simultaneously during a Newark, New Jersey quartet contest in 1948.

References

Further reading
Anthony Heilbut, Liner Notes to Kings of the Gospel Highway CD, Shanachie, c. 2000
Lee Hildebrand and Opal Nations, Liner Notes to The Original Five Blind Boys of Alabama CD, Specialty, 1993
Dorothy Moore, original source, 2008 [4]

External links
 
 

Blind musicians
American gospel musical groups
Musical groups from Chicago
Piney Woods Country Life School
Checker Records artists
Musical groups established in 1936
Musical groups disestablished in 1994